Abingdon is an unincorporated community in Jefferson County, Iowa, United States. It is located at the intersection of County Road H33 (Brookville Road) and Cedar Avenue, near the west edge of Jefferson County, at 41.082036N, -92.138772W.

History

Abingdon was founded by Colonel Thomas McCollough in August 1849 and named after Abingdon, Virginia. It was informally named Bogus because one early settler was "alleged to have been a counterfeiter".

Abingdon's population was 306 in 1902, 300 in 1925, 60 in 1940, and 140 in 1960.

References

Unincorporated communities in Jefferson County, Iowa
Unincorporated communities in Iowa
1849 establishments in Iowa
Populated places established in 1849